Donald O. Bair (March 9, 1903 – October 27, 1973) was a Republican member of the Pennsylvania House of Representatives.

References

Republican Party members of the Pennsylvania House of Representatives
1973 deaths
1903 births
20th-century American politicians